The northern spiny dogfish (Squalus griffini), also known as the brown dogfish, grey spiny dogfish or Griffin's dogfish, is a marine species of the family Squalidae, found off New Zealand's North Island.

In June 2018 the New Zealand Department of Conservation classified the northern spiny dogfish as "Not Threatened" with the qualifier "Secure Overseas" under the New Zealand Threat Classification System.

References

northern spuny dogfish
Fish of the North Island
northern spiny dogfish